Hanna Kulenty (born March 18, 1961, in Białystok) is a Polish composer of contemporary classical music. Since 1992, she has worked and lived both in Warsaw (Poland) and in Arnhem (Netherlands).

Musical education 
After studying piano at the Karol Szymanowski School of Music in Warsaw from 1976 to 1980, Kulenty studied composition with Włodzimierz Kotoński at the Fryderyk Chopin Music Academy in Warsaw. From 1986 to 1988 she studied composition with Louis Andriessen at the Royal Conservatory in The Hague. In 1984 and 1988 she participated in Darmstadt International Summer Courses for New Music. In 1983 and 1990 she was participant in the International Courses for Young Composers in Kazimierz, organised by the Polish section of the ISCM — where she attended lectures with Iannis Xenakis, Witold Lutosławski, Thomas Kessler and François-Bernard Mâche.

Main activities 
From 1989 Kulenty worked as a free-lance composer, and received numerous commissions and scholarships. She has composed 2 operas and 12 works for large orchestra. She has written numerous works for solo instruments and chamber groups. Since 2007 she is also involved in writing music for television plays and for film.

In 1990 she was for one-year guest composer at the German Academic Exchange Service (DAAD) in Berlin. In 1998 she was invited as guest lecturer at three universities around Los Angeles. In 1999/2000 she was composer-in-residence with Het Gelders Orkest in the Netherlands. In November 2000 a portrait concert was organized by Deutschlandfunk in Cologne (released on the CD ‘Arcs & Circles’). She lectured at the Other Minds 10 festival (San Francisco) and at Soundstreams Canada 2005 in Toronto. In 2007 she was guest professor at the ESMUC, Music Academy in Barcelona.

She was a jury member during Munich Biennale in 1995, during the Gaudeamus International Composers Award 2002 in Amsterdam, during the Kazimierz Serocki 9th International Composers’ Competition in Warsaw (2003), during the International New Chamber Opera Competition "Orpheus-Luciano Berio 2003–2004" in Spoleto, and in 2005 and 2007 during the International Competition of Contemporary Chamber Music in Cracow.

Style and technique of composition 
"Hanna Kulenty’s music is permeated with images of organic transformation and growth. The intuitive shaping of evolving sound patterns, extended phrases and richly detailed textures in these works results from Kulenty’s original compositional technique which she calls ‘the polyphony of arches’ or ‘arcs’. The works include many layers of simultaneous ‘arches’ which may begin at different points of their trajectories and proceed at different speeds.

Her compositional style has evolved during the years since her dazzling orchestral debut, Ad Unum, a powerful, dissonant, dramatic and well-crafted study of convergence towards musical unity. Since that work, Kulenty's preferred medium has been the symphony orchestra.

Through the 1990s the composer developed an original version of ‘post-minimalist’ style, characterized by a reduction of the number and density of musical layers, in comparison with the earlier, saturated and dramatic style of the ‘polyphony of arches’. She called this style her version of the ‘European trance music’. Kulenty seldom used sudden textural cuts and shifts in this period. Instead, she often structured her compositions as single, powerful arches, slowly evolving in time, gradually increasing their gripping intensity of emotion.

Her penchant for musical drama and intensity of emotion found a suitable expression in her music for stage. The ‘intuitive constructivism’ coupled with a heightened emotional intensity of her music is well-suited for highlighting dramatic situations. Kulenty's mastery of time and her ability to structure her musical material into layers moving inexorably, inevitably towards powerful climaxes brings a symphonic dimension to her other theatrical compositions.

Kulenty's latest compositional technique of the ‘polyphony of time dimensions’ emphasizes the circularity of time and the simultaneity of time-events occurring on different temporal planes."

Awards 
In 1985 Kulenty was awarded the second prize of the European Young Composers’ Competition organized in Amsterdam with Ad Unum for orchestra (1985).

In 1987 she was awarded the Stanislaw Wyspianski Award (2nd class).

In the same year she was awarded the second prize by the Young Composers’ Competition of the Polish Composers’ Union with Ride for 6 percussionists (1987).

She was also awarded prizes in the Composers’ Competition from the Warsaw branche of the Polish Composers’ Union: Quinto for 2 piano's (1986), first prize; Breathe for string orchestra (1987), first prize;Cannon for violin and piano (1988) third prize; aaa TRE for viola, cello and double bass (1988) second prize 1989.

In 2003 her composition Trumpet Concerto (2002) won the first prize at the 50th International Rostrum of Composers, for which she received the UNESCO Mozart Medal from the International Music Council.

Her compositions Preludium, Postludium and Psalm, for cello and accordion (2007) and String Quartet No. 3 – Tell me about it (2008), were respectively chosen among the ten best Dutch compositions of 2007 and 2008 during the ‘Toonzetters’ contest in Amsterdam.

About the performances 
Kulenty's compositions have been premiered at festivals throughout the world, such as the Huddersfield Contemporary Music Festival, Schleswig-Holstein Musik Festival, Munich Biennale, Warsaw Autumn, and Musica Polonica Nova. Her numerous orchestral pieces have been performed by symphony orchestras in the Netherlands (Radio Filharmonisch Orkest), Denmark (Danish National Symphony Orchestra), Poland, and Germany (Radio-Symphonie-Orchester Berlin), with conductors such as David Porcelijn, Antoni Wit, Peter Hirsch, Peter Eötvös, Ingo Metzmacher, Renato Rivolta, and Ronald Zollman. Soloists such as Isabelle van Keulen, Elisabeth Chojnacka, Krzysztof Bąkowski, Marco Blaauw, and Frank Peters have performed her work, as have the Dutch ensemble De Ereprijs, who commissioned her to write pieces on several occasions. In 2008 the Kronos Quartet performed her String Quartet No. 4. Since the success of her opera The Mother of Black-Winged Dreams at the Munich Biennale 1996 she is considered "one of the leading figures on the Polish composers’ scene".

Kulenty's compositions are published by Donemus (part of Music Center the Netherlands) in Amsterdam and by PWM Edition in Cracow.

List of works (by genre)

Operas and other stage works 
 Hoffmanniana (2003) – opera in two acts
 The Mother of Black-Winged Dreams (1995) – opera in one act
 Przypowieść o ziarnie [Parable on grain] (1985) – chamber opera / monodrama
 Island (2006) – stage work for trumpet solo, voice, ensemble and tape
 Lost & Found twenty-five (2008) – music-dance theater for ensemble and tape

Symphony orchestra and chamber orchestra 
 Ad unum (1985) – symphony orchestra
 Breathe (1987) – chamber orchestra
 Certus (1997) – chamber orchestra
 Part One (1998) – symphony orchestra
 Passacaglia (1992) – chamber orchestra
 Piano Concerto No. 2 (1991) – piano, symphony orchestra
 Piano Concerto No. 3 (2003) – piano, symphony orchestra
 Quatro (1986) – chamber orchestra
 Trigon (1989) – chamber orchestra
 Sinequan Forte A (1994) – solo amplified cello with delay,  symphony orchestra
 Sinequan Forte B (1994) solo amplified cello with delay, chamber orchestra
 Symphony No. 1 (1986) – symphony orchestra
 Symphony No. 2 (1987) – symphony orchestra, mixed choir
 Symphony No. 3 (2000) – symphony orchestra
 Trumpet Concerto (2002) –  trumpet, symphony orchestra
 Violin Concerto No. 1 (1993) – violin, symphony orchestra
 Violin Concerto No. 2 (1996) – violin, symphony orchestra

Large ensemble 
 A few minutes for Ereprijs (1992) – ensemble
 Air (1991) – ensemble
 Elfen (1997) – ballet music for ensemble
 Flute Concerto no. 1 (2001) – flute (amplified, delay) and chamber orchestra
 Going Up 2 (1995) – ensemble
 Mezzo Tango (2004) – brass band
 Mezzo Tango 2 (2005) – ensemble
 Piano Concerto No. 1 (1990) – piano, ensemble
 Perpetuus (1989) – ensemble
 Postcard from Europe (2004) – ensemble
 Violin Concerto No. 1 (1992) – violin, ensemble

Chamber groups 
 Arcus (1988) – three percussionists
 aaa TRE (1988) – viola, cello, double bass
 A Cradle Song (1993) – violin, cello, piano
 A Fourth Circle (1994) – violin (or viola/cello) and piano
 A Sixth Circle (1995) – trumpet, piano
 Asjaawaa (2001) – mezzo-soprano, flute, harp, piano, percussion, electronics
 Blattinus (1996) – saxophone quartet
 Brass No. 2 (2005) – for horn and trumpet
 Cannon (1988) – violin, piano
 Crossing Lines (2001) – violin, clarinet, piano
 Decimo (2000) – for choir, six voices
 Going Up 1 (1995) – violin, double bass
 Kisses & Crosses (2007) – for piano and percussion
 Lysanxia (1994) – gamelan, tape
 MM-blues (1999) – two piano's and two percussions
 Preludium, Postludium and Psalm (2007) – for cello and accordion
 Quinto (1986) – two pianos
 Rainbow 3 (2003) – flute, bass clarinet, piano
 Rapidus (1998) – saxophone quartet
 Ride (1987) – six percussionists
 Run (2004) – flute and piano
 Sierra (1996) – violin, cello
 Stretto (1998) – flute, clarinet, cello, guitar
 String Quartet no. 1 (1984)
 String Quartet No. 2 (1990)
 String Quartet No. 3 – Tell me about it (2007)
 String Quartet No. 4 (A Cradle Song) (2007)
 Tap-Blow-Dance4* (2020) 2 bass clarinets, violoncello, vibraphone [12']
 Sugar-Fela Tango (2009) – for piano and four instruments
 Tell me about it 1 (2006) – for clarinet, cello, trombone and piano
 Tell me about it 2 (2006) – for bass clarinet, cello, trombone and contra bas
 Waiting for… (1997) – voice, piano

Solo instruments 
 Arci (1986) – percussion solo
 A Fifth Circle (1994) – alto flute with delay
 A Third Circle (1996) – piano solo
 Brass No. 1 (2004) – trumpet solo
 Brass No. 2 (2004) – horn and trumpet
 Brass No. 3 (2005) – horn solo or trumpet solo
 Brass No. 4 (2007) – tuba solo
 Cadenza (1992) – violin solo with delay
 Drive Blues (2000) – piano solo
 E for E (1991) – harpsichord solo
 Harmonium (1999) – harmonium solo
 One by One (1988) – marimba solo
 Preludium and Psalm (2007) – harmonium solo or another keyboard instrument
 Sesto (1985) – piano solo
 Sinequan (1993) – cello solo with optional delay
 Sinequan (rev. 1993) – cello solo with delay
 Still Life with a Cello (1993) – cello solo
 Still Life with a Violin (1985) – violin solo
 Three Minutes for the Double Bass (1983) – double bass solo

Electroacoustic music 
 Prośba o Słońce [Request for the Sun] (1984) – electroacoustic tape
 Souvenir from a Sanatorium (1988) – computer music

See also 
 Polish composers
 Music of Poland
 List of Poles
 List of 20th century classical composers by birth date

Notes

References 
 Chłopecki, Andrzej. 1997. "Kulenty, Hanna". Encyklopedia Muzyczna PWM [PWM Music Encyclopedia] (biographical part, ed. by Elżbieta Dziębowska), Cracow: PWM. 
 Kapuściński, Marek. 1987. "Hanna Kulenty". Biographical note on record sleeve of Ad Unum. Warsaw: Arston Records, Poland.
 Thomas, Adrian. 2001. "Kulenty, Hannah". The New Grove Dictionary of Music and Musicians, edited by Stanley Sadie and John Tyrrell. London: Macmillan. 
 Trochimczyk, Maja. "Polish Composers: Hanna Kulenty". Extended biography on USC Polish Music Center. Retrieved on 2009-02-02.
 Von der Weid, Jean-Noël, La musique du XXe siècle, Paris, Fayard, coll. Pluriel, 2010, p. 232–233.

External links 
 
 Polish Music Center
 Polish Music Information Centre
 Donemus, Dutch publisher
 PWM, Polish publisher
 International Society for Contemporary Music

1961 births
Living people
Polish classical composers
Dutch women classical composers
Dutch classical composers
21st-century classical composers
Polish opera composers
Chopin University of Music alumni
People from Białystok
Royal Conservatory of The Hague alumni
International Rostrum of Composers prize-winners
Women opera composers
21st-century women composers
Polish women composers